Kennedy Crossan Academics Plus Elementary School is a historic elementary school building in the Burholme neighborhood of Philadelphia, Pennsylvania. It is part of the School District of Philadelphia. The building was designed by Irwin T. Catharine and built in 1922–1924. It is a two-story, nine-bay, brick building on a raised basement in the Late Gothic Revival style.  It features a central entrance with arched opening and stone surround and a crenellated brick parapet.

The building was added to the National Register of Historic Places in 1988.

References

External links

School buildings on the National Register of Historic Places in Philadelphia
Gothic Revival architecture in Pennsylvania
School buildings completed in 1924
Northeast Philadelphia
Public elementary schools in Philadelphia
School District of Philadelphia
1924 establishments in Pennsylvania